Port Ewen is a hamlet (and census-designated place) in Ulster County, New York, United States. The population was 3,678 at the 2020 census. Port Ewen is in the Town of Esopus, south of Kingston, along U.S. Route 9W.

History

The prospect of finding work with the Pennsylvania Coal Company attracted many to Port Ewen. Port Ewen was served by the West Shore Railroad, which shipped, among other freight, high explosives produced by the Nitro Powder Company in Kingston.

Before the opening of the Kingston–Port Ewen Suspension Bridge in 1921, those wishing to cross Rondout Creek would have to take the Skillypot, a chain ferry that ran to Sleightsburgh, and one which was noted for its sporadic service.

Geography
Port Ewen is on the west bank of the Hudson River at the mouth of Rondout Creek.

Port Ewen is located at  (41.906980, -73.978599).

Demographics

As of the census of 2000, there were 3,650 people, 1,475 households, and 982 families residing in the CDP. The population density was 1,867.3 per square mile (722.7/km2). There were 1,564 housing units at an average density of 800.1/sq mi (309.7/km2). The racial makeup of the CDP was 93.40% White, 2.68% African American, 0.22% Native American, 1.34% Asian, 0.63% from other races, and 1.73% from two or more races. Hispanic or Latino of any race were 1.86% of the population.

There were 1,475 households, out of which 31.2% had children under the age of 18 living with them, 51.1% were married couples living together, 10.3% had a female householder with no husband present, and 33.4% were non-families. 27.7% of all households were made up of individuals, and 9.8% had someone living alone who was 65 years of age or older. The average household size was 2.47 and the average family size was 3.02.

In the CDP, the population was spread out, with 25.3% under the age of 18, 5.9% from 18 to 24, 30.0% from 25 to 44, 26.1% from 45 to 64, and 12.7% who were 65 years of age or older. The median age was 39 years. For every 100 females, there were 89.4 males. For every 100 females age 18 and over, there were 86.3 males.

The median income for a household in the CDP was $41,949, and the median income for a family was $50,208. Males had a median income of $37,043 versus $27,583 for females. The per capita income for the CDP was $22,040. About 5.1% of families and 8.8% of the population were below the poverty line, including 14.5% of those under age 18 and 10.8% of those age 65 or over.

Notable people
Sojourner Truth was a slave in West Park, a few miles south of the hamlet, also within Esopus. She was enslaved for a time and forced to work at the tavern in town. Truth was enslaved by Martinus Schryver from 1808-1810, until he sold her to John Dunlap, also of West Park. Truth escaped in 1826. A statue of her now stands at the corner of Broadway and Salem Street.

Luann de Lesseps, former countess and current star of Real Housewives of New York City, purchased a home along the Hudson River in 2018. It has even been featured on the television show.

References

External links
 Town of Esopus Library

Census-designated places in New York (state)
Census-designated places in Ulster County, New York
Hamlets in New York (state)
Hamlets in Ulster County, New York
New York (state) populated places on the Hudson River